Takin' It To The Streets is the third studio album released by British hard rock band FM. Takin' It To The Streets was released in 1991 on the Music For Nations record label.

Track listing 
"I'm Ready" - 3:57 (S. Overland)
"I Heard It Through the Grapevine" - 4:27 (Norman Whitfield/Barrett Strong)
"Only the Strong Survive" - 5:25 (M. Goldsworthy/P. Jupp/S. Overland/A. Barnett)
"Just Can't Leave Her Alone" - 4:03 (M. Goldsworthy)
"She's No Angel" - 4:43 (M. Goldsworthy/P. Jupp/S. Overland/D. Digital)
"Dangerous Ground" - 4:33 (M. Goldsworthy/P. Jupp)
"Bad Blood" - 3:52 (M. Goldsworthy/P. Jupp/S. Overland)
"Crack Alley" - 4:53 (M. Goldsworthy)
"If It Feels Good (Do It)" - 4:30 (M. Goldsworthy/P. Jupp/S. Overland)
"The Girl's Gone Bad" - 4:39 (M. Goldsworthy/P. Jupp/S. Overland/A. Barnett)
"The Thrill of It All" - 4:02 (M. Goldsworthy)

Personnel 
Steve Overland - Lead vocals, guitar, acoustic guitar
Merv Goldsworthy - Bass, vocals
Pete Jupp - Drums, vocals
Didge Digital - Keyboards
Andy Barnett - Lead guitar, slide guitar, vocals
Steve Overland, Andy Barnett, Pete Jupp, Leigh Matty, Craig Joiner and Sonia Jones - Background vocals
Andy Barnett, Steve Overland and Craig Joiner - Guitar Solos
Martin Shaw, Dennis Rollins, 'Baps' McMillan and Kenny Wellington - The 'Raging' Horns
Augustus Gowalski - Horn Arrangement

Production 
Produced by Merv Goldsworthy, Steve Overland, Pete Jupp, Andy Barnett and Didge DigitalEngineered by Reg Hollywood and Andy ReillyRecorded at Ezee Studios (London) and The Old Chapel (Winchester)Mastered at The Hit Factory (London) by Tim Young

FM (British band) albums
1991 albums